Live at the Village Vanguard was the third album by Japanese pianist Junko Onishi, released on September 21, 1994, in Japan. It was released on May 2, 1995, by Blue Note Records.

This album was the first live recording of a Japanese jazz musician at the Village Vanguard.

Reception

The Allmusic review by Scott Yanow stated, "
This is a memorable set. When pianist Junko Onishi performs songs from the likes of Charles Mingus ("So Long Eric"), John Lewis ("Concorde"), and Ornette Coleman ("Congeniality"),
she interprets each of the tunes as much as possible within the intent and style of its composer.
"So Long Eric," although performed by her trio, gives one the impression at times that several horns are soloing together; in addition, polyrhythms are utilized part of the time, Ornette's "Congeniality" has a strong pulse but fairly free improvising, while "Concorde" sounds both distinguished and full of blues feeling, like John Lewis himself. Onishi's exploration of "Blue Skies" uplifts the warhorse through the use of colorful vamps and an altered melody, she takes the slow ballad "Darn That Dream" as a medium-tempo stomp, and her original, "How Long Has This Been Goin' On," is brooding but not downbeat and swings hard without losing its serious nature.
There is not a weak selection in the bunch and the interplay between Onishi, bassist Reginald Veal, and drummer Herlin Riley is quite impressive.".

Track listing

Personnel
Junko Onishi - Piano
Reginald Veal - Bass
Herlin Riley - Drums

Production
Executive Producer - Hitoshi Namekata
Co-Producer - Junko Onishi
Recording and Mixing Engineer - Jim Anderson
Assistant Engineer - Brian Kingman, James Biggs, Mark Shane
Mixing Engineer - Masuzo Iida
Mastering engineer - Yoshio Okazuki
Cover Photograph - Norman Saito
Art director - Kaoru Taku
A&R - Yoshiko Tsuge

References

External links
Junko Onishi HP

1994 albums
Junko Onishi albums
Albums recorded at the Village Vanguard